Alessio Corti (born 1965) is a Professor of Mathematics at Imperial College London working in Algebraic Geometry.

Corti studied at the University of Pisa and Scuola Normale Superiore in Pisa, where he gained a diploma (Laurea) in 1987.  He obtained his PhD in 1992 at the University of Utah under the supervision of János Kollár.

As a post-doctoral researcher, he was at the Scuola Normale Superiore in Pisa and at the Mathematical Sciences Research Institute in Berkeley, California. From 1993 to 1996 he was the Dickson Instructor at the University of Chicago and in 1996 became lecturer, later reader, of mathematics at the University of Cambridge. From 2005 he is a professor at Imperial College London. In 2002, he was awarded the London Mathematical Society's Whitehead Prize.

He is the originator of a project to create a periodic table of shapes.

He is married and has a daughter, Beatrice (born 17 September 1992).

References

External links
Imperial website

1965 births
Academics of Imperial College London
Italian mathematicians
Living people
20th-century British mathematicians
21st-century British mathematicians
Winners of the Geneva International Music Competition
University of Pisa alumni
University of Utah alumni
Cambridge mathematicians
University of Chicago fellows
Scientists from Milan